Europium(III) oxalate (Eu2(C2O4)3) is a chemical compound of europium and oxalic acid. There are different hydrates including the decahydrate, hexahydrate and tetrahydrate.
Europium(II) oxalate is also known.

Preparation 

An excess of oxalate is added to a hot solution of Eu3+ cations. The resulting precipitate of Eu2(C2O4)3 ⋅ 10H2O is dried in a desiccator.

Properties 

Europium(III) oxide (Eu2O3) can be prepared by calcining europium(III) oxalate.

The dehydration of Eu2(C2O4)3 · 10H2O occurs below 200 °C:

 Eu2(C2O4)3*10H2O -> Eu2(C2O4)3*6H2O -> Eu2(C2O4)3*4H2O -> Eu2(C2O4)3 

The decomposition of this compound takes place in two stages, the first at 350 °C and the second at about 620 °C.

 Eu2(C2O4)3 -> Eu2[CO3]3 + 3 CO -> Eu2O3 + 3 CO2 + 3 CO 

In the Mössbauer spectrum, Eu2(C2O4)3 · 10H2O shows an isomer shift of +0,26 mm/s with a line width of 2,38 mm/s, in reference to EuF3. The Debye temperature of Eu2(C2O4)3 is 166±15 K.

Eu2(C2O4)3 · 10H2O crystallizes monoclinically in the space group of P21/c (space group no. 14) with the lattice parameters a = 1098,  b = 961, c = 1004 pm and β = 114.2° with four formula units per unit cell.

Nanoparticles show a line emission when excited by a light source of 393 nm, the transitions 5D0→7F1 (592 nm) and 5D0→7F2 (616 nm) can then be found in the spectrum. This can be used as a red phosphor for white LEDs.

References 

Europium(III) compounds
Oxalates